Salix rosmarinifolia (vernacular name: rosemary-leaved willow) is a species of flowering plant belonging to the family Salicaceae.

It is native to Europe.

References

rosmarinifolia
Flora of Europe
Taxa named by Carl Linnaeus